The 1938 Kansas State Wildcats football team represented Kansas State University in the 1938 college football season. The team's head football coach was Wesley Fry, in his fourth year at the helm of the Wildcats. The Wildcats played their home games in Memorial Stadium. The Wildcats finished the season with a 4–4–1 record with a 1–3–1 record in conference play. They finished in fifth place in the Big Six Conference.  The Wildcats scored 108 points and gave up 134 points.

Schedule

References

Kansas State
Kansas State Wildcats football seasons
Kansas State Wildcats football